The Democratic Socialist Caucus of the Chicago City Council is a bloc of aldermen in the Chicago City Council. The block was unofficially organized as the Socialist Caucus in 2019, and later organized as a formal caucus with its current name in 2021. It currently has five members, out of the 50 aldermen that comprise the Council. Members of the caucus identify as democratic socialists.

History 
The caucus was initially organized as the Socialist Caucus following the 2019 Chicago aldermanic election by six aldermen, all of whom were members of the Chicago chapter of Democratic Socialists of America. All six members also joined the larger Progressive Reform Caucus. The two caucuses pursue similar policy goals, but the Socialist Caucus' stated goal is to push a wider and more aggressive range of left-wing policies. When asked about the distinction between the two caucuses in a July 2019 interview, Carlos Ramirez-Rosa provided the example of a municipal takeover of the electric utility company ComEd as one distinctive policy that the Socialist Caucus would pursue.

During the COVID-19 pandemic in Illinois, members of the caucus called for a wide-ranging recovery package including an paid emergency leave, emergency housing, an end to ICE check-ins, and weekly payments to workers and families. During the George Floyd protests, the caucus called for cutting funding to the Chicago Police Department and increasing funding for programs such as substance-abuse treatment, mental health care and after-school programs.

On May 1, 2021, five members of the group formally organized as the Democratic Socialist Caucus, with Ramirez-Rosa serving as the chair.

Membership 
The following table lists current aldermen who are affiliated with the caucus since its formal organization in 2021. Andre Vasquez was also a member of the caucus when it was unofficially organized in 2019, but was not part of the founding membership in 2021.

See also 
 Chicago Aldermanic Black Caucus
 Chicago City Council Latino Caucus
 Chicago City Council LGBT Caucus
 Chicago City Council Progressive Reform Caucus
 List of Democratic Socialists of America who have held office in the United States

Notes

References 

Democratic socialist organizations in the United States
Issue-based groups of legislators
Caucuses of the Chicago City Council